Mathew Olorunleke (born 4 October 1983) is a Nigerian professional footballer turned manager, who currently serves as head coach of Bagnolese.

Career

Playing career
Olorunleke has had his entire playing career in Italy, starting with Bagnolese. He then moved on to Trento, Nocerina, Reggiana, Messina, Catanzaro, Juve Stabia, Lecco and Nocerina. He returned at Bagnolese in 2010 as a player/assistant manager.

Coaching career
He retired in 2011 but stayed at Bagnolese as assistant manager to Ivano Vacondio.

In summer 2012 he was promoted as new head coach, replacing Vacondio himself until October 2012, when he was renamed as his assistant. In December 2012 he was renamed head coach of the team.

References

External links

1983 births
Living people
Nigerian footballers
Nigerian expatriate footballers
A.C. Reggiana 1919 players
A.C.R. Messina players
U.S. Catanzaro 1929 players
S.S. Juve Stabia players
Rovigo Calcio players
Calcio Lecco 1912 players
Serie A players
Serie B players
Expatriate footballers in Italy
Association football defenders